The Magyar Kupa Final was the final match of the 2014–15 Magyar Kupa, played between Videoton and Ferencváros.

Route to the final

Match

References

External links
 Official site 

2015
Fehérvár FC matches
Ferencvárosi TC matches